Mychommatus is a genus of beetles in the family Buprestidae, containing the following species:

 Mychommatus delaunayi Thery, 1947
 Mychommatus marinus Curletti, 2002
 Mychommatus violaceus (Fabricius, 1787)

References

Buprestidae genera